Juan Sobrino is a civil engineer, known internationally for designing more than 400 bridges, introduction of advanced materials in bridges and innovative bridge designs. He is the founder of Pedelta, an international structural engineering firm.

Sobrino was an adjunct professor at Carnegie Mellon University from 2010 to 2012, and a part-time associate professor at Polytechnic University of Catalonia.

Education
Dr. Sobrino studied Civil Engineering at Technical University of Catalonia (UPC), and earned Master of Science in 1990. He went on to pursue a PhD in Civil Engineering.  He has been actively involved in sharing his industry experience and research experience with students and young engineers as he is frequently invited as a guest speaker in Civil Engineering departments of universities including Princeton and the University of Notre Dame in Indiana.

Career
Dr. Sobrino founded Pedelta immediately after earning his PhD in 1994. Since then, he has been involved in design of new bridges, as well as assessment and rehabilitation of existing bridges in USA, Canada, Latin America, Europe and Asia.

Awards
 2003 IABSE (International Association for Bridge & Structural Engineering) award 
 2005 GFRP Lleida Footbridge Awarded with Footbridge Award. Venice, Italy.
 2012 Innovation award Spain, Spanish Board of Civil Engineers, Valencia, Spain.
 2012 The Triplets, La Paz, Bolivia awarded with Eugene C.Figg Jr. medal, Pittsburgh, PA, USA.
 2015 Medal of Professional Merit, Spanish Board of Civil Engineers, Madrid, Spain.

Innovations
Amongst his various innovative bridge designs, his application of use of advance materials has reached international recognition, with completed bridge examples including  the first stainless steel vehicular bridge in Menorca, the stainless steel arch pedestrian bridge in Sant Fruitos, the first hybrid stainless steel and GFRP pedestrian  bridges of Zumaia and Vilafant, as well as the Abetxuko Bridge, a steel girder/organic form bridge.

Notable projects

See also
Cala Galdana Bridge  
Abetxuko Bridge
GFRP Lleida Pedestrian Bridge

References
 

Living people
Spanish civil engineers
Bridges in Spain
Academic staff of the Polytechnic University of Catalonia
Carnegie Mellon University faculty
Year of birth missing (living people)